Hassoun (see also Hasson) is a Hebrew surname (חסון) and an Arabic given name and surname (حسون). Arabic variants include Hassoun, Hassun, Hassouné, Hassouneh etc. It may refer to:

Hassoun

Given name
Hassoun Camara (born 1986), French footballer

Middle name
Alwan Hassoun Alwan al-Abousi (born 1944), Iraqi Air Force Major General

Surname
Abdullah Hassoun (born 1997), Saudi Arabian footballer
Ahmad Badreddin Hassoun, Islamic scholar, Grand Mufti of Syria 
Adham Hassoun, detained in United States custody and indicted as a conspirator of José Padilla
Hassoun Camara (born 1984), French football player of Senegalese descent
Jacques Hassoun (1936–1999), French psychologist and proponent of the ideas of Jacques Lacan
Malek Hassoun (born 1975), Lebanese footballer
Mohamed Hassoun (born 1968), Syrian wrestler
Rizkalla Hassoun (1825-1880), Syrian christianic arabic poet, journalist.
Shatha Hassoun, Arab singer half Moroccan, half Iraqi, winner of the 4th season of the pan-Arab TV talent show Star Academy Lebanon
Soha Hassoun, American computer scientist
Talal Hassoun Abdul Kader (born 1953), Iraqi weightlifter
Wassef Ali Hassoun (born 1980), United States Marine who was charged with desertion

Hassoon
Adel Abo Hassoon (born 1970), Syrian television actor and voice actor

Hassouné
Jade Hassouné (born 1991), Lebanese-Canadian actor, dancer and singer

Hassouneh
Hassouneh Al-Sheikh (born 1977), Jordanian footballer of Palestinian origin

See also
Mohamed Khair Abou Hassoun, Syrian television, stage actor and voice actor